The 1993–94 Macedonian Second Football League was the second season since its establishment. It began in August 1993 and ended in June 1994.

East

Participating teams

League standing

West

Participating teams

League standing

See also
1993–94 Macedonian Football Cup
1993–94 Macedonian First Football League

References

External links
Macedonia - List of final tables (RSSSF)
Football Federation of Macedonia 
MacedonianFootball.com 

Macedonia 2
2
Macedonian Second Football League seasons